Getting Down to Business is an album by trumpeter Donald Byrd featuring performances recorded in 1989 and released on the Landmark label the following year.

Reception

On Allmusic, Scott Yanow observed "Trumpeter Donald Byrd's second jazz album during his comeback after years of playing R&B/funk and then totally neglecting his horn finds him starting to regain his former form. The strong supporting cast sometimes overshadows the leader on this CD but the music overall (modern hard bop) is rewarding". The Penguin Guide to Jazz praised the contributions of Garrett and Henderson, while suggesting that the trumpeter's own playing had declined.

Track listing
All compositions by Donald Byrd except where noted.
 "Theme for Malcolm" (Donald Brown) – 7:39
 "That's All There Is to Love" – 5:43
 "Pomponio" (Bobby Hutcherson) – 10:18
 "I Got It Bad (and That Ain't Good)" (Duke Ellington, Paul Francis Webster) – 8:29 Additional track on CD
 "A Certain Attitude" (James Williams) – 5:13
 "The Onliest" – 9:55
 "Around the Corner" (Joe Henderson) – 8:07

Personnel
Donald Byrd – trumpet, flugelhorn
Joe Henderson – tenor saxophone
Kenny Garrett – alto saxophone (tracks 1, 3-5 & 7)
Donald Brown - piano
Peter Washington – bass
Al Foster – drums

References

Landmark Records albums
Donald Byrd albums
1990 albums
Albums produced by Orrin Keepnews
Albums recorded at Van Gelder Studio